The 2000 Missouri Tigers football team represented the University of Missouri during the 2000 NCAA Division I-A football season.  Larry Smith was the coach in 2000. After the season, he was fired and replaced by new coach Gary Pinkel (see also Missouri Tigers football under Gary Pinkel). They began the season promisingly with a 50–20 win over Western Illinois.  The next week, however, they lost by 53 points at No. 17 Clemson which set the tone for the rest of the season. Although they were able to win twice in conference, they continually had very little success against ranked opponents.

Schedule

Coaching staff

Players drafted into the NFL

References

Missouri
Missouri Tigers football seasons
Missouri Tigers football